Albert George Baidoe Amoah is a Ghanaian academic. In 2005 he was inducted as a fellow of the Ghana Academy of Arts and Sciences.

References

Fellows of the Ghana Academy of Arts and Sciences
Living people
Year of birth missing (living people)
Place of birth missing (living people)
21st-century Ghanaian people